Timothy "Tim" Brown (born 6 July 1944) is an Australian former professional darts player. He used the nickname Brownie.

Career
Brown made three BDO World Darts Championship appearances with his best performance being in 1978. He also played in 1981 and 1982 but suffered first round defeats in both years to Leighton Rees and Joe Dodd respectively.

Brown quit the BDO in 1988.

World Championship results

BDO
 1978: Quarter-final (lost to John Lowe 1–6) (legs)
 1981: 1st round (lost to Leighton Rees 0–2) (sets)
 1982: 1st round (lost to Joe Dodd 1–2)

External links
 Profile at Darts Database

Australian darts players
Living people
British Darts Organisation players
1944 births
People from Mandurah